This article lists political parties in Seychelles.
Seychelles has a two-party system, which means that there are two dominant political parties (SPPF and SNP), with extreme difficulty for anybody to achieve electoral success under the banner of any other party.

The parties

Parliamentary parties

Other parties

Former parties

 Seychelles United Party (SUP) (formerly the New Democratic Party)
 Independent Conservative Union of Seychelles (ICUS)

The election of the National Assembly was held on the 22–24 October 2020. The Seychelles National Party, the Seychelles Party for Social Justice and Democracy and the Seychelles United Party formed a coalition, Linyon Demokratik Seselwa (LDS). The coalition won the majority of the seats.

See also
 Politics of Seychelles
 List of political parties by country

References

Seychelles
 
Political parties
Political parties
Seychelles